Baso is the middle town between Bukittinggi and Payakumbuh, West Sumatra. It is 15 kilometers east of Bukittingi.

History
In the history of West Sumatra this town was the transit and junction town of Payakumbuh, Bukittinggi and Batusangkar. This town was known also as the most important farmers' trading and crops collection point in West Sumatra. The Dutch built railway stations, markets, and other supporting facilities like post offices, banks, even one of biggest teacher school in West Sumatra (PGRI).

In the early '70s, as the age of the automobile (replacing steam train and horse wagon) began in Sumatra, this town slowly lost its strategic position as a transit point.

In recent years Baso has developed as a ribbon town with small shops and its local community services. The famous Baso farmers' market now only left as history. In the early 90s most of its heritage, such as old train station, old market, and Dutch buildings were replaced by semi-modern buildings.

Populated places in West Sumatra